Apostolos Tsiolis (born 10 December 1996) is a Greek professional footballer who plays as an attacking midfielder.

References

1996 births
Living people
Greek footballers
Super League Greece players
Football League (Greece) players
Gamma Ethniki players
Asteras Tripolis F.C. players
Pierikos F.C. players
Niki Volos F.C. players
Association football midfielders
Footballers from Trikala